Zahida Kazmi is Pakistan's first female taxi driver.

Career
Kazmi divorced in 1992 at age 33; she then decided to become a taxi driver. She has served as chairman of the All Pakistan Yellow Cab Federation.

References

Living people
Pakistani women
Pakistani taxi drivers
Hindkowan people
People from Abbottabad
People from Karachi
People from Rawalpindi
Year of birth missing (living people)